Wettinia kalbreyeri is a species of flowering plant in the family Arecaceae. It is found in Colombia and Ecuador. The plant is named after the Victorian plant collector, Guillermo Kalbreyer (1847 – 1912).  It is commonly called the macana palm.

References

kalbreyeri
Flora of Colombia
Flora of Ecuador
Least concern plants
Least concern biota of South America
Taxonomy articles created by Polbot
Taxa named by Max Burret